Zbigniew Robert Promiński (born 30 December 1978 in Tczew), stage name Inferno, is a Polish heavy metal musician, best known as the drummer for extreme metal band Behemoth. He has also contributed to bands such as Azarath, Witchmaster, Damnation, Deus Mortem, Artrosis, Christ Agony, and Devilyn. Also, his endorsements include Paiste cymbals, Czarcie Kopyto pedals, Pearl drums, Evans Drumheads, and Vic Firth drumsticks.

Inferno joined Behemoth in 1997. He left the group briefly in 1999 during the release of Satanica, but returned in early 2000.

At NAMM 2008, Spaun Drums unveiled a 8x14 signature Inferno snare drum. The 18 ply Maple/Birch snare drum features a gun-metal finish with custom graphics and diecast hoops.

Discography

Setup

References

Polish heavy metal drummers
Male drummers
Behemoth (band) members
1978 births
Living people
People from Tczew
Black metal musicians
Death metal musicians
21st-century drummers